Sawar Muhammad Hussain (Urdu: سوار محمد حسین; c. 18 January 1949 – 10 December 1971), was a soldier in the Pakistan Army and was the first to be awarded the Nishan-e-Haider.

Early life and career 
Sawar Hussain was born in Punjabi Janjua family on 18 January 1949 in Dhok Nishan e Haider (Jatli), Pakistan. He joined the 20 Lancers of the Armoured Corps in September 1966 at the age of 17 years. After Sawar Hussain's death his village Dhok Pir Bakhsh was renamed Dhok Muhammad Hussain Janjua to commemorate his sacrifice.

Death 
Sawar Hussain was a driver from the armored Corp but he would take part in every battle his unit got engaged in during the Indo-Pakistani War of 1971. On 5 December 1971, in the Zafarwal-Shakargarh area, he delivered ammunition from trench to trench under heavy enemy fire. On 10 December 1971, he took part in a dangerous mission and went out for reconnaissance and to fight enemy patrols. During reconnaissance, he spotted an enemy tank and directed a recoil-less rifle crew towards the tank and then later was responsible for the destruction of 16 enemy tanks. He was hit in the chest by a burst of machine-gun fire while exposing himself as he was directing fire from recoilless rifles, and was killed. After his death his father proudly said "My son received bullets on his chest like a lion"

Buried

Muhammad Hussain was buried on/near Jatli-Devi road.

Awards and decorations

References

External links 
 https://www.ispr.gov.pk/sowar-hussain-shaheed.php

1949 births
1971 deaths
Recipients of Nishan-e-Haider
Pakistan Army personnel
People of the Indo-Pakistani War of 1971
Pakistani military personnel killed in action
People from Gujar Khan
Punjabi people